Li Myong-gum (born 6 June 1968) is a North Korean archer. She competed in the women's individual and team events at the 1992 Summer Olympics.

References

1968 births
Living people
North Korean female archers
Olympic archers of North Korea
Archers at the 1992 Summer Olympics
Place of birth missing (living people)
Archers at the 1990 Asian Games
Medalists at the 1990 Asian Games
Asian Games medalists in archery
Asian Games bronze medalists for North Korea
20th-century North Korean women